HMS A7 was an  submarine built for the Royal Navy in the first decade of the 20th century. She sank in a training accident in 1914 with the loss of her entire crew. Efforts to salvage her failed and her wreck is a protected site. Diving on her is prohibited without a licence from the Ministry of Defence.

Design and description
A7 was a member of the first British class of submarines, although slightly larger, faster and more heavily armed than the lead ship, . They displaced  on the surface and  submerged. The A-class submarines had a crew of 2 officers and 9 ratings.

For surface running, the boats were powered by a single 16-cylinder  Wolseley petrol engine that drove one propeller shaft. When submerged the propeller was driven by a  electric motor. They could reach  on the surface and  underwater.

The boats were armed with two 18-inch (45 cm) torpedo tubes in the bow. They could carry a pair of reload torpedoes, but generally did not as doing so that they had to compensate for their weight by an equivalent weight of fuel.

Construction and career
A7 was ordered as part of the 1903–04 Naval Programme from at Vickers. She was laid down at their shipyard in Barrow-in-Furness on 1 September 1903, launched on 21 January 1905 and completed on 13 April. A disturbance in the water was seen which thought to be caused by the crew of A7 attempting to blow water from her ballast tanks in a desperate attempt to reach the surface. The location was marked with a buoy and Pygmy returned to Plymouth Sound to report on the disaster. Pygmy returned to the site in the afternoon but was unable to locate the buoy as the weather had deteriorated. Several attempts were made to salvage her over the next month by attaching a hawser to the towing eye on the bow or wrapping steel hawsers around her hull, but her stern was too deeply embedded in the mud and the hawsers parted without pulling her out. In 2001, she was declared as one of 16 wrecks in British waters designated as "Controlled Sites" under the Protection of Military Remains Act by the British Government and which cannot be dived without special permission.

In 2014 the SHIPS Project team in Plymouth completed an archaeological investigation of the A7 submarine, having been granted a licence by the UK Ministry of Defence.

Notes

References

External links
MaritimeQuest HMS A-7 Pages
HMS A-7 Roll of Honour

SI 2008/950 Designation under the Protection of Military Remains Act 1986
'Submarine losses 1904 to present day' - Royal Navy Submarine Museum
The A7 Project - an archaeological investigation of HM submarine A7 

 

A-class submarines (1903)
Protected Wrecks of the United Kingdom
1914 disasters in the United Kingdom
British submarine accidents
Shipwrecks in the English Channel
Maritime incidents in January 1914
Ships built in Barrow-in-Furness
Royal Navy ship names
1905 ships